Le Perreux-sur-Marne (literally Le Perreux on Marne) is a commune in the Val-de-Marne department in the eastern suburbs of Paris, France.

History
The commune of Le Perreux-sur-Marne was created on 28 February 1887 by detaching its territory from the commune of Nogent-sur-Marne.

Education
 the municipal preschools had a total of 1,171 students and the municipal elementary schools had a total of 1,839 students.

Public preschools:
 Maternelle Les Thillards
 Maternelle Paul Doumer
 Maternelle Clemenceau
 Maternelle De Lattre
 Maternelle Jules Ferry

Public elementary schools:
 Élémentaire Pierre Brossolette
 Élémentaire Clemenceau A
 Élémentaire Clemenceau B
 Élémentaire Jules Ferry

There are two public junior high schools, Collège Pierre Brossolette and Collège de Lattre, as well as one public senior high school/sixth-form college: Lycée Polyvalent Paul Doumer.

Private schools:
 Les Coccinelles Montessori (preschool)
 Saint-Joseph (preschool and primary school)
 Notre Dame de toutes Grâces (preschool and primary school)

Transport
Le Perreux-sur-Marne is served by :

Train RER :

 Nogent – Le Perreux station on Paris RER E on the southwest side of the city 
 Neuilly-Plaisance station on Paris RER A on the northeast side of the city.

Bus :

 Line 113 to Nogent-sur-Marne and Chelles.
 Line 114 to Château de Vincennes and Gare du Raincy - Villemomble.
 Line 116 to Gare de Champigny and  Gare de Rosny-Bois-Perrier.
 Line 116 to Gare de Champigny and Gare de Rosny-Bois-Perrier.
 Line 120 to Gare de Nogent-sur-Marne and Gare de Noisy-le-Grand / Mont d'Est.
 Line 210 to Château de Vincennes and Gare de Villiers-sur-Marne / Plessis-Trévise.
 Line 317 to Gare de Nogent-Le Perreux and Créteil Mairie.

Noctilien (Night Bus) :

Service between 12h30 AM et 05h30 AM.

 Line N34 Gare de Lyon - Torcy RER
 Line N35 Gare de Lyon - Nogent-Le Perreux RER
 Line N142 Gare de l'Est - Tournan RER

Car :

 By Trunk Road RN34 to Paris Porte de Vincennes.
 By Motorway of the East (Autoroute de l'Est A4 Connecting Paris to Metz, Exit Pont de Nogent.
 By the seconde Ring road around Paris A86 (sometimes called "Paris super-périphérique") and then  The Motorway of the North A3 (Paris Porte de Bagnolet - Lille) .

Twin Town 

  Forchheim, Germany, since 1974.

See also 

Communes of the Val-de-Marne department
Marcel Gaumont. Sculptor of war memorial

References

External links

Official website (in French)

Communes of Val-de-Marne